Aldo Eminente (19 August 1931 – 25 August 2021) was a French freestyle swimmer and Olympic medalist. He was born in Hanoi, French Indochina. He competed at the 1952 Olympic Games in Helsinki, where he received a bronze medal in the 4 x 200 m freestyle relay with the French swimming team (with Jean Boiteux, Joseph Bernardo, and Alexandre Jany).

References

External links

 

1931 births
2021 deaths
Sportspeople from Hanoi
Olympic swimmers of France
Swimmers at the 1952 Summer Olympics
Swimmers at the 1956 Summer Olympics
Olympic bronze medalists for France
World record setters in swimming
Olympic bronze medalists in swimming
French male freestyle swimmers
European Aquatics Championships medalists in swimming
Medalists at the 1952 Summer Olympics
Mediterranean Games gold medalists for France
Swimmers at the 1955 Mediterranean Games
Mediterranean Games medalists in swimming
20th-century French people
21st-century French people